Little River Township (also designated Township 9) is one of twenty townships within Wake County, North Carolina, United States. As of the 2010 census, Little River Township had a population of 12,528, a 14.0% increase over 2000.

Little River Township, occupying  in eastern Wake County, includes the entire town of Zebulon.

References

Townships in Wake County, North Carolina
Townships in North Carolina